ORMDL sphingolipid biosynthesis regulator 3 is a protein that in humans is encoded by the ORMDL3 gene. This gene is associated with asthma in childhood. Transgenic mice which overexpress human ORMDL3 have increased levels of IgE. This correlated with increased numbers of macrophages, neutrophils, eosinophils, CD4+ and enhanced Th2 cytokine levels in the lung tissue.

Localisation 
Mouse and human ORMDL3 gene encode 153 aa. ORMDL family consists of three members (ORMDL1-3) which are localised in the membrane of endoplasmic reticulum (ER). Human ORMDL1, ORMDL2 and ORMDL3 are localised in chromosomes 2q32, 12q13.2 a 17q21.

Function 
ORMDL3 plays role in sphingolipid synthesis like negative regulators. It also has a role in regulation of Ca2+ levels in the endoplasmic reticulum. ER is very important for generation, signalisation, functioning and store of intracellular Ca2+. There are channels, which control the exit of Ca2+ from the ER into the cytoplasm and also pumps (sarco-endoplasmic reticulum Ca2+ ATPase (SERCA)) which return Ca2+ back to the ER. Dysregulation of Ca2+ has the key role in several pathological conditions like dysfunction of SERCA, asthma, and Alzheimer's.

Clinical significance 

Mutations in ORMDL3 are associated with inflammatory disease like Crohn's disease, type 1 diabetes, and rheumatoid arthritis.

References

Further reading 

 
 
 
 

Immunology
Inflammations
Protein families